Tysland is a surname. Notable people with the surname include:

Georg Tysland (1890–1932), Norwegian engineer and metallurgist
Kelly Stephens-Tysland (born 1983), American ice hockey player
Terje Tysland (born 1951), Norwegian singer, songwriter, guitarist, and accordion player

Norwegian-language surnames